The 2022 Malaysia M5 League (Malay: 2022 Liga M5 Malaysia) is the inaugural season of the League competition since its establishment in 2019. It is in the fifth tier of the Malaysia football league system. The league has several leagues registered under it.

A Ligue M5 Amisi Physio

Group A

Group B

Group C

Group D

Play-off round

Bracket

Knock-out stage

Round of 16

First leg

Second leg 

OSV FC won 5-2 on aggregate.

Ukay Positive won 6-2 on aggregate.

FC Cheras Road won 7-2 on aggregate.

Maghreb FC won 4-2 on aggregate.

Southern FC won 4-2 on aggregate.

Arslan FC won on away goal regulation, aggregate 1-1.

Sky United won 2-1 on aggregate.

Seri Gemilang Outlaw won on away goal regulation, aggregate 3-3.

Quarter-finals

First leg

Second leg 

OSV UK won 6-1 on aggregate.

Maghreb FC won 7-2 on aggregate.

Southern FC won 3-2 on aggregate.

Seri Gemilang Outlaw won 1-0 on aggregate.

Semi-finals

First leg

Second leg 

Maghreb FC won 5-1 on aggregate.

OSV UK won 3-1 on aggregate.

Final

OSV UK FC Champions and promoted to Malaysia M4 League

Liga Mahsa-Kronos M5

Knock-out stage

Kuantan Amateur League

<onlyinclude><noinclude>

Nogori M5 League

League 1

Group A

Group B

Knock-out stage

Quarter-finals

Semi-finals

Finals

League 2

Group A

Group B

Knock-out stage

Quarter-finals

First leg

Second leg

Semi-finals

First leg

Second leg

Finals

Liga M5 Piala Dato Verdon Bahanda P167 2022

Group A

Group B

Group C

Group D

Play-off round

Bracket

S Ligue M5 Sarawak

Group A

Group B

Knock-out stage

Putrajaya League

Ligue M5 Bintulu 2022

Group A

Group B

Knock-out stage

See also
 2022 Malaysia Super League
 2022 Malaysia Premier League
 2022 Malaysia M3 League
 2022 Malaysia FA Cup

References

External links
 Amateur Football League
Liga Mahsa-Kronos
Nogori M5 League
A Ligue
Kuantan Amateur League
Piala Dato Verdon
S Ligue M5 Sarawak

4
Malay